Parel Vallei High School  is a co-ed high school located in Parel Vallei, a suburb of Somerset West, which is in the Western Cape, South Africa.

Pupils attending the school are from the surrounding towns, such as Somerset West and Strand, as well as areas further away, such as Grabouw.

Academics
The following National Senior Certificate subjects are offered by the school, classes are mostly bilingually tutored.:
 Afrikaans Home Language
 Afrikaans First Additional Language
 English Home Language
 English First Additional Language
 German Second Additional Language (After school)
 French Second Additional Language (After School)
 Pure Mathematics
 Mathematical Literacy
 Advanced Programme Mathematics
 Physical Sciences
 Life Sciences
 History
 Geography
 Consumer Studies
 Accounting
 Business Studies
 Information Technology
 Engineering Graphics and Design
 Life Orientation
 Dramatic Arts
 Visual Communications Design
 Music

PV in the news
Parel Vallei was in the published media regarding submissions to the school. The school had a few legal issues as it did not accept applications to the school due to size limitations. The school is currently in the process of building and extending the school. In 2004, the school was briefly in the local news after the governing body presented the idea to erect a cellphone mast on the school grounds to the community.
In 2019 Danielle Kleyn, a learner at Parel Vallei, was crowned "Queen of Mathematics" at the 2019 Pan-African Mathematics Olympiad.
In 2020 the school faced backlash after several social media posts alleging that one student called another student of a different race a slur. This was reported on by the media and commented on by higher-ups in the Department of Education.
In 2021, Benjamin Kleyn received an honorable mention after participating in the National Programming Olympiad.
In 2021, Christian Kotzé was crowned winner winner chicken dinner on the VIA TV show "Slim vang sy baas".

References

External links
 Official Website

Schools in the Western Cape
1986 establishments in South Africa
Cambridge schools in South Africa
Bilingual schools in South Africa